Robert Lissauer (May 1, 1917 – October 14, 2004) was an American composer, author, and musicologist.

Born in New York City Lissauer attended the Juilliard School and then worked with Irving Berlin on his musical This Is the Army. From this production "Yanks A Poppin" was developed as a show that could be performed for troops in the field. As a soldier in World War II, Lissauer managed a production unit that traveled across the Pacific Theater.

Working as head of his own music publishing companies in the 1960s, Lissauer signed singer-songwriters Marsha Malamet and Judy Wieder.

After the war Lissauer taught at New York University, owned a sheet music business, and managed various composers, singers, and their estates. A lifetime of experience led to his writing Lissauer's Encyclopedia of Popular Music in America: 1888 to the Present, 1991 and 1996 editions.  The second edition contains over 19,000 annotated entries.  He died in New York City.  Robert Lissauer was married four times and had three children.  His son John is a composer and arranger of music, and has done the scores for several popular movies.

References

1917 births
2004 deaths
Songwriters from New York (state)
American male composers
20th-century American composers
20th-century American musicologists
20th-century American male musicians
American male songwriters
Juilliard School alumni
United States Army personnel of World War II
New York University faculty